Barbariga can refer to:

 Barbariga, Croatia, a village in Croatia
 Barbariga, Lombardy, a comune in the Province of Brescia, Italy